The War Production Board (WPB) was an agency of the United States government that supervised war production during World War II. President Franklin D. Roosevelt established it in January 1942, with Executive Order 9024. The WPB replaced the Supply Priorities and Allocations Board and the Office of Production Management.

The WPB directed conversion of companies engaged in activities relevant to war from peacetime work to war needs, allocated scarce materials, established priorities in the distribution of materials and services, and prohibited nonessential production. It rationed such commodities as gasoline, heating oil, metals, rubber, paper, and plastics. It was dissolved shortly after the defeat of Japan in 1945 and was replaced by the Civilian Production Administration in late 1945.

In 1942–1945, WPB supervised the production of $183 billion (equivalent to $ in ) worth of weapons and supplies, about 40 percent of the world output of munitions. The UK, the USSR, and other allies produced an additional 30 percent, while the Axis produced only 30 percent. One fourth of the US output was warplanes; one fourth was warships. Meanwhile, the civilian standard of living was about level.

Organization

The first chair of the Board was Donald Nelson, who served from 1942 to 1944. He was succeeded by Julius Albert Krug, who served from 1944 until the Board was dissolved.

The national WPB constituted the chair, the Secretaries of War, Navy, and Agriculture, the lieutenant general in charge of War Department procurement, the director of the Office of Price Administration, the Federal Loan Administrator, the chair of the Board of Economic Warfare, and the special assistant to the President for the defense aid program. The WPB had advisory, policy-making, and progress-reporting divisions.

The WPB employed mathematicians who were responsible for constructing and maintaining multilevel models of resources needed for the war effort. Their models included manufacturing defects, materials lost when ships were sunk at sea, &c. Upon analyzing field reports which revealed systematic shortages, the mathematicians decided to increase allocations submitted to the board by a factor of 10.

The WPB managed 12 regional offices and operated 120 field offices throughout the nation. They worked alongside state war production boards, which maintained records on state war production facilities and also helped state businesses obtain war contracts and loans.

The national WPB's primary task was converting civilian industry to war production. The WPB assigned priorities and allocated scarce materials such as steel, aluminum, and rubber, prohibited nonessential industrial production such as that of nylons and refrigerators, controlled wages and prices, and mobilized the people through patriotic propaganda such as "give your scrap metal and help Oklahoma boys save our way of life". It initiated events such as scrap metal drives, which were carried out locally to great success. For example, a national scrap metal drive in October 1942 resulted in an average of almost  of scrap per American.

WPB order M-9-C related to the conservation of copper and, in May 1942, The Film Daily reported that this would apply to the production of new motion picture sound and projection equipment but not to the delivery of items already produced.

Effects

The WPB and the nation's factories effected a great turnaround. Military aircraft production, which totaled 6,000 in 1940, jumped to 85,000 in 1943. Factories that made silk ribbons now produced parachutes, automobile factories built tanks, typewriter companies converted to rifles, undergarment manufacturers sewed mosquito netting, and a rollercoaster manufacturer converted to the production of bomber repair platforms. The WPB ensured that each factory received the materials it needed to produce the most war goods in the shortest time.

Nelson faced extensive criticism from the military during his tenure. Described by historian Doris Kearns Goodwin as "habitually indecisive", Nelson had difficulty sorting the conflicting requests from various agencies. Secretary of War Henry L. Stimson regularly criticized Nelson for his "inability to take charge". He argued endlessly with Robert P. Patterson of the War Department. Patterson typically demanded that civilian needs be given lower priority because military supplies were essential to winning the war, and that argument usually prevailed. In February 1943, Roosevelt invited Bernard Baruch to replace Nelson as WPB head, but was persuaded to change his mind by advisor Harry Hopkins, and Nelson remained in the post.  

From 1942 to 1945 the WPB directed a total production of $185 billion (equivalent to $ in ) worth of armaments and supplies. At war's end, most production restrictions were quickly lifted, and the WPB was abolished on November 3, 1945, with its remaining functions transferred to the Civilian Production Administration.

Members

William Beverly Murphy, president and CEO of Campbell Soup Company
Charles E. Wilson, president of General Electric
T. S. Fitch, president and CEO of Washington Steel Corporation
Faustin Johnson Solon, a chair of the War Production Board, representing O-I Glass
Irving Brown, representing the American Federation of Labor

Civilian Production Administration
Executive Order 9638 created the Civilian Production Administration and terminated the War Production Board on October 4, 1945. The Civilian Production Board was consolidated with other agencies to form the Office of Temporary Controls—an agency in the Office for Emergency Management of the executive office of the president. The latter had previously been established pursuant to the Reorganization Act of 1939. The executive order provided a Temporary Controls Administrator, appointed by the president, to head the Office of Temporary Controls and vested in him, among other things, the functions of the Price Administrator.

See also

Board of Economic Warfare
 Combined Food Board, with Britain and Canada
 Combined Munitions Assignments Board,  the most important board
 Combined Production and Resources Board
 Combined Raw Materials Board
National War Labor Board
War Manpower Commission
Office of Price Administration
Office of War Mobilization

Notes

Selected publications

 Studies in industrial price control by United States Office of Temporary Controls. U.S. Govt. Print. Off., 1947  
 Problems in price control: legal phases by United States Office of Temporary Controls. U.S. Govt. Print. Off., 1947  
 Problems in price control by United States Office of Temporary Controls. U.S. Govt. Print. Off., 1948  
 The beginnings of OPA by United States Office of Temporary Controls. Office of Temporary Controls, Office of Price Administration, 1947  
 Guaranteed wages by United States Office of Temporary Controls. U.S. Govt. Print. Off., 1947

Further reading
 Carew, Michael G. Becoming the Arsenal: The American Industrial Mobilization for World War II, 1938–1942 (University Press of America, 2010).

  online
 Eiler, Keith E. Mobilizing America: Robert P. Patterson and the War Effort, 1940–1945 (1997) 

 

 Holl, Richard E. From the boardroom to the war room: America's corporate liberals and FDR's preparedness program (University of Rochester Press, 2005).
 Koistinen, Paul A.C. Arsenal of World War II: The political economy of American warfare, 1940–1945 (2004) online.
 Koistinen, Paul AC. "Mobilizing the World War II economy: labor and the industrial-military alliance." Pacific Historical Review (1973): 443–478 online.

 United States Bureau of the Budget. The United States at war; development and administration of the war program by the Federal Government (1946; reprint 1972) online also for downloading

 Wilson, Mark R. " 'Taking a Nickel Out of the Cash Register': Statutory Renegotiation of Military Contracts and the Politics of Profit Control in the United States during World War II." Law and History Review 28.2 (2010): 343–383.

External links
 War Production Board

Defunct agencies of the United States government
Agencies of the United States government during World War II
Government agencies established in 1942
Government agencies disestablished in 1945
1942 establishments in the United States